Srihati is a village in Kamrup rural district, situated near south bank of river Brahmaputra.

Transport
The village is located north of National Highway 37, connected to nearby towns and cities with regular buses and other modes of transportation.

See also
 Hajo
 Kamalpur

References

Villages in Kamrup district